The rufous-eared brushfinch (Atlapetes rufigenis) is a species of bird in the family Passerellidae.

It is found at high altitudes in woodland and shrub in the Andes of west-central Peru. It sometimes includes the Apurimac brush finch as a subspecies.

It is threatened by habitat loss.

References

rufous-eared brushfinch
Birds of the Peruvian Andes
Endemic birds of Peru
rufous-eared brushfinch
rufous-eared brushfinch
Taxonomy articles created by Polbot